Amphimallon burmeisteri is a species of beetle in the Melolonthinae subfamily that can be found in Austria, Croatia, France, Hungary, Italy, Kosovo, Montenegro, Serbia, Slovenia and Voivodina.

References

Beetles described in 1886
burmeisteri
Beetles of Europe